This article serves as an index – as complete as possible – of all the honorific orders or similar decorations awarded by Germany, classified by Monarchies chapter and Republics chapter, and, under each chapter, recipients' countries and the detailed list of recipients.

Awards

Monarchies 

European monarchies

British Royal Family 
 HM Queen Elizabeth II :  Grand Cross Special Class of the Order of Merit of the Federal Republic of Germany (1958)

Norwegian Royal Family 
See also decorations pages (mark °) : Harald, Sonja, Haakon, Mette-Marit, Mârtha Louise, Astrid & Ragnhild

 Harald V of Norway: Grand Cross First class of the Order of Merit of the Federal Republic of Germany °
 Queen Sonja of Norway: Grand Cross First class of the Order of Merit of the Federal Republic of Germany°
 Haakon, Crown Prince of Norway: Grand Cross First class of the Order of Merit of the Federal Republic of Germany°
 Princess Astrid of Norway: Grand Cross First class of the Order of Merit of the Federal Republic of Germany°

Swedish Royal Family 

 Carl XVI Gustaf of Sweden : Grand Cross of the Order of Merit of the Federal Republic of Germany
 Queen Silvia of Sweden : Grand Cross of the Order of Merit of the Federal Republic of Germany
 Victoria, Crown Princess of Sweden : Grand Cross of the Order of Merit of the Federal Republic of Germany
 Prince Carl Philip, Duke of Värmland : Grand Cross of the Order of Merit of the Federal Republic of Germany
 Princess Madeleine, Duchess of Hälsingland and Gästrikland : Grand Cross of the Order of Merit of the Federal Republic of Germany
 Princess Christina, Mrs. Magnuson: Grand Cross of the Order of Merit of the Federal Republic of Germany

Danish Royal Family 
Official website pages (click on "Decorations") : Margrethe - Henrik - Frederik - Mary - Joachim - Marie - Benedikte

 Margrethe II of Denmark : Grand Cross Special Class of the Order of Merit of the Federal Republic of Germany
 Frederik, Crown Prince of Denmark : Grand Cross First Class of the Order of Merit of the Federal Republic of Germany
 Prince Joachim of Denmark : Grand-Cross First Class of the Order of Merit of the Federal Republic of Germany
 Princess Benedikte of Denmark : Grand Cross First Class of the Order of Merit of the Federal Republic of Germany

Dutch Royal Family 

 King Willem-Alexander of the Netherlands : Grand Cross First class of the Order of Merit of the Federal Republic of Germany
 Queen Máxima of the Netherlands : Grand Cross First class of the Order of Merit of the Federal Republic of Germany
 Princess Beatrix of the Netherlands : Grand Cross Special Class of the Order of Merit of the Federal Republic of Germany (1983)
 late Prince Claus of the Netherlands  : Grand Cross Special Class of the Order of Merit of the Federal Republic of Germany
 Princess Margriet of the Netherlands : Grand Cross First class of the Order of Merit of the Federal Republic of Germany
 Pieter van Vollenhoven : Grand Cross First class of the Order of Merit of the Federal Republic of Germany

Belgian Royal Family 

King & Queen's state visit in Germany (10 - 12/07/1995) - President : Roman Herzog - Chancellor : Helmut Kohl
State visit in Belgium of the President of Federal Republic of Germany & Mrs Roman Herzog (13 - 15/07/1998).
King & Queen's state visit in Germany (29 - 30/03/2011) - President : Christian Wulff - Chancellor : Angela Merkel

 King Philippe : Grand Cross of the Order of Merit of the Federal Republic (1998)
 King Albert II : Grand Cross Special Class of the Order of Merit of the Federal Republic (1995) 
 Queen Paola : Grand Cross Special Class of the Order of Merit of the Federal Republic (1995) 
 Princess Astrid : Grand-Cross of the Order of Merit of the Federal Republic of Germany (1998) 
 Princess Astrid : Grand-Cross of the Order of Merit of the Federal Republic of Germany (1998) 
 Prince Lorenz : Grand-Cross of the Order of Merit of the Federal Republic of Germany (1998)
 Prince Laurent : Grand-Cross of the Order of Merit of the Federal Republic of Germany (1998) 
 Others :  Queen Mathilde & Princess Claire : not yet princesses in 1998 ;

Luxembourgish Grand-Ducal Family 
None

Spanish Royal Family 

 Juan Carlos I of Spain : Grand Cross Special Class of the Order of Merit of the Federal Republic of Germany
 Queen Sofía of Spain : Grand Cross Special Class of the Order of Merit of the Federal Republic of Germany

Middle East monarchies

Jordanian Royal Family 
 Abdullah II of Jordan : Grand Cross Special Class of the Order of Merit of the Federal Republic (21.10.2002) 
 Queen Rania of Jordan : Grand Cross Special Class of the Order of Merit of the Federal Republic (21.10.2002) 

Asian monarchies

Thai Royal Family 

 King Maha Vajiralongkorn of Thailand : Grand Cross (Special Class) of the Order of Merit of the Federal Republic of Germany
 Queen Sirikit of Thailand : Grand Cross (Special Class) of the Order of Merit of the Federal Republic of Germany, 1960
 Princess Sirindhorn of Thailand : Grand Cross 1st Class of The Order of Merit of the Federal Republic of Germany, 1984

Malaysia Royal Families

Perak Royal Family 
 Sultan Azlan Shah of Perak (since 02/1984 & as YdPA from 04/1989 to 04/1994):
 Grand Cross Special Class of the Order of Merit of the Federal Republic of Germany  (07/09/1992)

Japanese Imperial Family 
 Emperor Akihito : Grand Cross, Special Class of the Order of Merit of the Federal Republic of Germany 
 Empress Michiko: Order of Merit of the Federal Republic of Germany

Republics

References 

 
Germany